Luca Ceccarelli may refer to:
Luca Ceccarelli (footballer, born 20 March 1983), Italian football fullback, currently plays for Arezzo
Luca Ceccarelli (footballer, born 24 March 1983), Italian football winger or fullback, currently plays for San Marino Calcio
Luca Ceccarelli (filmmaker) (born in 1974) Filmmaker, born in Nottingham

See also
Luca Ceccaroli (born 1995), Sanmarinese footballer